Planogyra clappi is a species of gastropods belonging to the family Valloniidae.

The species is found in Northern America.

The species is named in honor of American businessmann and malacologist George Hubbard Clapp.

References

Valloniidae